Aiken House may refer to:
 Fred C. Aiken House, listed on the National Register of Historic Places (NRHP) in Boca Raton, Florida
 David Aikens House, listed on the NRHP in Columbus, Indiana
 Aiken House (Rensselaer, New York), listed on the NRHP in Rensselaer County, New York
 Abraham Aiken House, listed on the NRHP in Willsboro, New York
 Gov. William Aiken House, listed on the NRHP in Charleston, South Carolina
 Hugh Aiken House, listed on the NRHP in Greenville, South Carolina
 William Aiken House and Associated Railroad Structures, listed on the NRHP in Charleston, South Carolina
 White-Aiken House, listed on the NRHP in Salado, Texas